The Solway Investment Group Limited, is a private international mining and metals group located in Switzerland. The Group conducts operations in North Macedonia, Ukraine, Indonesia and Guatemala. 

The company has been accused of various misconducts, including environmental crimes in its operation in Guatemala. The company has been involved in suspicious banking transactions.

Subsidiaries
Solway Industries
Solway Resource
Solway Finance Ltd

History
Aluminum: In the mid-90s acquired controlling interests in several aluminum plants, the Volgograd Aluminum Plant, the Volkhov Aluminum Plant, and the Pikalevo Alumina Plant. These were sold in 2006 to SUAL, now part of Rusal.
Ferroalloy: In 1996 a controlling interest was acquired in the Kluchevskoy Ferroalloys Plant in the Ural region. The plant produced a wide range of ferroalloys and rare earth alloys. Solway's interest was sold to a manager group in 2003. It is now part of MidUral Group.
Steel: The Red October Steel Plant in Volgograd was acquired in 1999 from creditors in bankruptcy. The plant was restarted and full production restored. It was sold in 2003 to Midland Group. It is now a part of Rosoboronexport, a state-owned firm.
Scopski Leguri, an idle smelter in Macedonia was acquired in 2006 and restarted using high-grade manganese ore to produce FeSiMn. The plant was resold in 2006 to investors.

Properties and investments
The Fenix nickel project is a nickel resource in Guatemala which was purchased from Hudbay Minerals in 2011 for $170 million. The operation had been on care and maintenance since 1980. Since 2011, Solway has invested almost US $620 million into the Fenix Project.  Today, the Fenix Project consists of a world-class nickel mine, a newly built power plant and the ProNiCo metal processing facility. The project has mining rights to 36.2 million tons of nickel ore reserves with 1.86% nickel, as well as the rights to an additional 70.0 million tons of resources within its license area. In 2014, the ProNiCo plant began operating, and is currently moving towards operating at its production capacity of over 20 kt of Ni pa.
Pobuzhskiy Ferronickel Plant (PFP) in Ukraine. The plant was built in 1964 in the Soviet Union. It had been idle for 3 years when Solway acquired it in 2003. The facility was converted to focus on the production of a single commodity: ferronickel produced from laterite nickel ores imported from Indonesia and New Caledonia, and later, from Solway’s project in Guatemala.Since 2003, Solway has invested over US $200 million into modernizing PFP. The plant currently has an annual production capacity of over 22,000 metric tons of Ni and over 1,100 thousand metric tons of dry laterite ore. The Pobuzhskiy Ferronickel Plant. is a member of the Kyiv Chamber of Commerce and Industry.
DOO Bucim in North Macedonia. Solway acquired the bankrupted Bucim mine in 2005 when it won the Macedonian government’s international tender. Since 2005, Solway Investment Group has invested over US $50 million in the Buchim mine. Today, Bucim is an open pit mine which produces premium flotation concentrate containing copper and gold, and a SX/EW operation producing LME-grade cathode copper. Buchim processes over 4.5 million tons of ore annually. Over 40,000 tons of copper concentrate containing gold are produced each year.  Within the Buchim project, Solway is developing the Borov Dol mine which will extend the life of the Buchim operation to at least 2028. An estimated US $56 million of total capital expenditures will be dedicated to the Borov Dol project.
Aquila nickel project, 2005, Indonesia. Aquila Nickel is a greenfield nickel and cobalt project focused on the construction of a large, top-tier nickel producer in Indonesia. The resource base consists of Maba, a world-class, large Ni-Co deposit located on Halmahera Island. Currently, the project is estimated to have resources of over 120 million tons of dry saprolite ore, with an average nickel grade of 1.58%, as well as over 80 million tons of dry limonite ore, with a nickel grade of 1.15% and a cobalt grade of 0.15%. In 2017, the group obtained all the necessary permits required to proceed to the next stage of the project, including the main mining license.
Kurilgeo, Urup Island, Russia. Solway owns and operates a gold mining project on Urup Island, one of the Kuril Islands, in Russia’s Far East. The group obtained an exploration license for the area covering over 50.8 square kilometers in 2005. In March 2010, Solway obtained and registered a 25-year mining license for the KurilGeo gold project. Solway has invested US $49 million into the asset to date. KurilGeo has an annual production capacity of over 50,000 ounces of gold.
Investment in Coro Mining Corp in May 2011 San Jorge Copper project in Mendoza Province. Argentina. Today the Group acquired a 100% ownership of the project.

Criticism 
The company is accused of bribery, corruption and environmental crimes, based on secret internal documents sent to the journalistic association Forbidden Stories led by the French journalist and founder Laurent Richard. Solway has strong links here with the Guatemala-based company Pronico, whose mine has caused an environmental disaster with emissions of high levels of nickel in Guatemala's largest lake. Cheating with filters in the chimneys has also been revealed as a result of diseases and eczema among the local Maya people around the lake. A documentary was also made in March 2022 for SVT (Swedish Television) where the leaked documents revealed the scandal. It is the result of a large investigation "Mining Secrets" to which 65 journalists from 15 countries participated, including journalists from El País (Spain), Le Monde (France) and Prensa Comunitaria (Guatemala), which also uncovered evidence of spying on journalists, and manipulation and intimidation of indigenous leaders.

Notes and references

External links
Official website

Mining companies of Switzerland